Brazilian Zouk is a partner dance which began in Brazil during the early 1990s. Brazilian Zouk evolved from the partner dance known as the Lambada. As the Lambada music genre went out of fashion, Lambada dancers turned to Caribbean Zouk (from the francophone, Caribbean Islands) as their music of choice. It was this transition that birthed the dance known as Brazilian Zouk. The term "Brazilian Zouk" was adopted in order to distinguish the dance style from the  musical genre "Caribbean Zouk". Nowadays the term "Zouk" is commonly used to refer to the "Brazilian Zouk" dance style. The most characteristic feature of Brazilian Zouk is the follower's upper body movements which are led out of axis by intricate leading and following techniques. Other features include body isolations, tilted turns and more recently counter-balance techniques. Brazilian Zouk is a dance with well defined basic steps and rhythmic patterns. The representation of these steps and rhythmic patterns varies depending on the substyle of Zouk. The overall plasticity of the movements and the range of musical genres it is danced to make Brazilian Zouk a partner dance that caters to creativity and improvisation. Over time, Zouk dancers have experimented and incorporated other styles of music into Zouk, such as R'n'B, pop, hip hop and contemporary (amongst others).

Styles
As Brazilian Zouk made a name for itself in the dance community talented and influential dancers began to develop and explore to create more definitive styles, either by sheer development as a Zouk school, or by fusing Zouk with other dance styles such as Bachata, Salsa, Argentinian Tango, Contact Improvisation or West Coast Swing.

As of 2019, two of the most popular branches of Brazilian Zouk are Traditional (Rio) and Lamba. Several styles of Brazilian Zouk have evolved, and the dances continue to evolve as Zouk gains popularity around the world. Styles that are presented at dance schools outside Brazil include:

Traditional Zouk (or Rio-style Zouk) is a style of Brazilian Zouk that can be both linear and circular, and contains a set of elements or basic patterns that are known under a certain name (in Portuguese), like Viradinha or Elástico. Notable dancers (but not limited to) within this style would be Adilio Porto, Renata Pençanha and Jaime Aroxa. 
Lamba Zouk (or Zouk lambada, or Porto Seguro style) has the closest connection to Lambada. It is characterized by constant, nonstop movement, unlike the Traditional style. Well known dancers of this style would be Ry'el and Jessica (based in New York) and their branch of Brazilian Zouk Lambada called "ZenZouk". Also noteworthy are Gilson Damasco, Olaya and Papagayo, all now based in Spain, to mention a few.
Mzouk is the only style originated outside of Brazil, but in Mallorca, Spain parallel to the other styles. Mzouk defines its basic steps and movements by nomenclature rather than preset patterns. This means that patterns can be defined as a sequence of specific movements. A representative couple is Daniel and Leticia Estévez. 
Soulzouk regards itself as a philosophy of dance rather than style with focus on Biomechanics. Its goal is to dance with great comfort, especially in the followers, and with the least expenditure of energy as possible. His creator and one of his representatives is China Soulzouk. 
Zouk Flow created by Arknjo 20 years ago at Rio de Janeiro, is a style influenced by urban culture. Uses synergy and natural movements of the body to create steps. 
Neozouk is a style of basically circular movements and a philosophy about the energy management of these, developed by a DJ, dancer, teacher and producer Mafie Zouker, from Rio de Janeiro, and his then-partner Ruanita Santos, who is now based in Netherlands.

Many professional Zouk dancers are creating and naming new sub-styles influenced by contemporary dance, hip-hop dance and others.

References

Brazilian Zouk gains popularity in the US (Yahoo News Article)
Mzouk, my small little world / By Daniel Estévez. 

Brazilian dances
Latin dances